
The following is a list of Playboy Playmates of 1970.  Playboy magazine names their Playmate of the Month each month throughout the year.

January

Jill Taylor (born October 14, 1951 in Van Nuys, California) is an American model. She was Playboy magazine's Playmate of the Month for its January 1970 issue.

February

Linda Forsythe (born May 14, 1950 in Jersey City, New Jersey) is an American model.  She was Playboy magazine's Playmate of the Month for its February 1970 issue. Her centerfold was photographed by Pompeo Posar.

March

Christine Koren (born August 8, 1947 in Cleveland, Ohio) is an American model.  She was Playboy magazine's Playmate of the Month for its March 1970 issue. Her centerfold was photographed by William Figge and Mel Figge.

April
 
Barbara Hillary (born February 18, 1949 in Milwaukee, Wisconsin) was Playboy magazine's Playmate of the Month for the April 1970 issue. Her centerfold was photographed by Pompeo Posar.

May

Jennifer Liano (born February 24, 1948 in San Diego, California) is an American model of Italian descent.  She was Playboy magazine's Playmate of the Month for its May 1970 issue. Her centerfold was photographed by Dwight Hooker.

June

Elaine Morton (born August 17, 1949 in Wichita Falls, Texas) is an American model.  She was Playboy magazine's Playmate of the Month for its June 1970 issue.
Her cousin, Karen Morton, was the July 1978 Playmate.

July

Carol Willis (April 17, 1949 – November 24, 1971) was an American model. She was Playboy magazine's Playmate of the Month for its July 1970 issue and her centerfold was photographed by Pompeo Posar.

She died in an automobile accident in Laguna Beach, California.

August

Sharon Clark (born October 15, 1943 in Seminole, Oklahoma) is an American model and actress.  She is Playboy's Playmate of the Month for August 1970.  Her centerfold was photographed by William Figge and Ed DeLong. In 1971, at age 27, she became the oldest Playmate of the Year so far and remained so for 15 years, until Miss May 1985 Kathy Shower became PMOY 1986 at age 33. She was also a Playboy Bunny at the St. Louis club.

September

Debbie Ellison (born June 17, 1949 in Atlantic City, New Jersey) is an American model.  She is best known for being Playboy magazine's Playmate of the Month for its September 1970 issue. Her centerfold was photographed by Pompeo Posar. This centerfold was later used in the movie Tremors 2: Aftershocks as a double for Helen Shaver, although she is incorrectly identified in the movie as Miss October 1974. She was also a Playboy Bunny at the New York club.

October

Mary Collinson (born July 22, 1952) is a model and actress . She was chosen as Playboy magazine's Playmate of the Month in October 1970, together with her twin sister Madeleine Collinson.  They were the first identical twin Playmate sisters.

Both sisters went on to acting careers, mostly in B-movies. Her sister is quoted in The Playmate Book as saying that Mary has two daughters and now lives in Milan with an "Italian gentleman", with whom she has been for more than 20 years.

Madeleine Collinson (July 22, 1952 – August 14, 2014) was a model and actress. She was chosen as Playboy Playmate of the Month in October, 1970, together with her twin sister Mary. 

Both sisters went on to acting careers, mostly in B-movies. Madeleine married a British Royal Air Force officer and raised three children. She later moved back to Malta and was involved in cultural and educational activities there. After several months of illness, she died at Mater Dei Hospital in Msida on August 14, 2014 with her sister Mary present.

November

Avis Miller (born November 4, 1945 in Ohio) is an American model. She was Playboy magazine's Playmate of the Month for the November 1970 issue. Her centerfold was photographed by Dwight Hooker. She was also a Playboy Bunny at the San Francisco club.

December

Carol Imhof (born March 13, 1948 in Chicago, Illinois) was an American model.  She was Playboy magazine's Playmate of the Month for its December 1970 issue.  Her centerfold was photographed by Dwight Hooker.

Imhof studied elementary education at Southern Illinois University and worked at the Playboy Club in Chicago. She also appeared in the July 1969 and February 1970 issues of Playboy.

References

1970-related lists
1970
Playmates of 1970